This is a list of South African television-related events in 2017.

Events
9 July - Craig Lucas wins the second season of The Voice South Africa.
12 November - A cappella group AnecNote win the eighth season of SA's Got Talent.

Debuts

Changes of network affiliation

Television shows

1980s
Good Morning South Africa (1985–present)
Carte Blanche (1988–present)

1990s
Top Billing (1992–present)
Generations (1994–present)
Isidingo (1998–present)

2000s
Idols South Africa (2002–present)
Rhythm City (2007–present)
SA's Got Talent (2009–present)

2010s
The Voice South Africa (2016–present)

Ending this year

Births

Deaths

See also
2017 in South Africa

 
2017 in South Africa